Alaoui Mohamed Taher (born 15 July 1971) is a Djiboutian judoka.

Taher competed at the 1992 Summer Olympics held in Barcelona, he entered the lightweight class and after receiving a bye in the first round he was beaten by Israeli judoka Oren Smadja, so he didn't advance any further.

References

1971 births
Living people
Djiboutian male judoka
Judoka at the 1992 Summer Olympics
Olympic judoka of Djibouti
Place of birth missing (living people)